The 19th European Film Awards were presented on December 2, 2006 in Warsaw, Poland. The winners were selected by the members of the European Film Academy.

Awards

Best Film

Best Documentary

References

External links 
 European Film Academy Archive

2006 film awards
European Film Awards ceremonies
2006 in Poland
2006 in Europe